Margaret V. Sachs is an American lawyer. She is currently the Robert Cotten Alston Professor at University of Georgia.

A native of Washington, D.C. who joined the Georgia Law faculty in 1990, she received her B.A. from Harvard University and her J.D. from Harvard Law School.

References

Year of birth missing (living people)
Living people
Harvard College alumni
Harvard Law School alumni
University of Georgia faculty
American lawyers